Sam Williams is a British record producer. He is best known as a member of the British band The Animalhouse with Mark Gardener, and for co-producing the 90s Britpop band, Supergrass.

Life and career
In 1994, Williams was signed to Fontana Records as the frontman of the band, The Mystics. The band were paid a large advance to produce the record, but their debut album was never released due to an internal dispute.

Over the last 20 years, Williams has worked with several British and international artists including Supergrass, Plan B, The Noisettes, David Bowie, Kula Shaker, JJ Cale, Benson Taylor, Gaz Coombes, The Mystics, A Silent Film, Polar Circles and The Go! Team.

References

External links
 
 Discogs.com entry
 Allmusic.com entry

Year of birth missing (living people)
Living people
20th-century English singers
21st-century English singers
Alternative rock singers
British alternative rock musicians
English male singers
English rock singers
English rock guitarists
English male guitarists
20th-century British guitarists
21st-century British guitarists
20th-century British male singers
21st-century British male singers